Iulian Cătălin Apostol, (born 3 December 1980 in Galaţi) is a former Romanian footballer.

Club career
On 31 August 2010 he signed a contract with Steaua București alongside teammates from Unirea Urziceni: Galamaz, Ricardo, Marinescu, Bilaşco, Onofraş and next week Brandán.

After only three months, Apostol terminated his contract with Steaua.

International goals

Titles

References

External links
 Official FCSB profile  
 

1980 births
Living people
Romanian footballers
Association football midfielders
Romania international footballers
Liga I players
Liga II players
FCM Dunărea Galați players
CSO Plopeni players
FC Gloria Buzău players
FCV Farul Constanța players
ASC Oțelul Galați players
FC Unirea Urziceni players
FC Steaua București players
FC Rapid București players
Sportspeople from Galați